The 2022–23 season is the 163rd in the history of TSV 1860 Munich and their fifth consecutive season in the third division. The club are participating in 3. Liga and DFB-Pokal.

Players

Out on loan

Transfers

Pre-season and friendlies

Competitions

Overall record

3. Liga

League table

Results summary

Results by round

Matches 
The league fixtures were announced on 24 June 2022.

DFB-Pokal

References 

TSV 1860 Munich seasons
TSV 1860 Munich